Craig Robinson may refer to:

Craig Robinson (actor) (born 1971), actor; played Darryl Philbin on NBC's The Office
Craig Robinson (baseball) (born 1948), former Major League baseball player
Craig Robinson (basketball) (born 1962), college coach and brother of Michelle Obama
Craig Robinson (designer) (born 1972), American fashion designer
Craig Robinson (rugby league) (born 1985), rugby league footballer

See also
Greg Robinson (disambiguation)